Michael Tagicakibau (born 9 May 1985) is a Fijian rugby union player. He is the brother of former Samoa international winger Sailosi Tagicakibau. He has signed to play for Manawatu in the Mitre 10 Cup.

Career
He is currently playing for the professional Italian team Benetton Treviso, having joined from Welsh region Scarlets and played in the English club, Saracens until July 2014. He has also played for Bristol. His usual position is on the wing. Prior to joining Saracens, he was playing for London Welsh in National League 1 and after an impressive first full season in English rugby, Saracens' then-Director of Rugby Brendan Venter signed him up for the 2009/10 season. He has played internationally for Fiji unlike his brother who played internationally for Samoa.

Tagicakibau played in the Air NZ Cup for Taranaki before attending the trials for the Flying Fijians in 2007. He was part of the Fiji squad for the 2007 Pacific Nations Cup and made his debut against Tonga in June 2007 at Churchill Park, Lautoka and though he did not make the squad for the 2007 Rugby World Cup, he impressed the London Welsh team who he joined on February 2008.

External links
 Fiji profile
 Saracens profile
 Scrum profile

References

1985 births
Fijian rugby union players
Living people
Rugby union wings
Saracens F.C. players
Scarlets players
Fiji international rugby union players
New Zealand people of I-Taukei Fijian descent
New Zealand people of Fijian descent
New Zealand expatriate rugby union players
Fijian expatriate rugby union players
Expatriate rugby union players in England
New Zealand expatriate sportspeople in England
Fijian expatriate sportspeople in England
Taranaki rugby union players
People from Auckland